Angular displacement of a body is the angle (in radians, degrees or revolutions) through which a point revolves around a centre or a specified axis in a specified sense. When a body rotates about its axis, the motion cannot simply be analyzed as a particle, as in circular motion it undergoes a changing velocity and acceleration at any time (t).  When dealing with the rotation of a body, it becomes simpler to consider the body itself rigid.  A body is generally considered rigid when the separations between all the particles remains constant throughout the body's motion, so for example parts of its mass are not flying off.  In a realistic sense, all things can be deformable, however this impact is minimal and negligible.  Thus the rotation of a rigid body over a fixed axis is referred to as rotational motion.

Example
In the example illustrated to the right (or above in some mobile versions), a particle or body P is at a fixed distance r from the origin, O, rotating counterclockwise. It becomes important to then represent the position of particle P in terms of its polar coordinates (r, θ).  In this particular example, the value of θ is changing, while the value of the radius remains the same.  (In rectangular coordinates (x, y) both x and y vary with time). As the particle moves along the circle, it travels an arc length s, which becomes related to the angular position through the relationship:-

Measurements
Angular displacement may be measured in radians or degrees. Using radians provides a very simple relationship between distance traveled around the circle and the distance r from the centre.

For example, if a body rotates 360° around a circle of radius r, the angular displacement is given by the distance traveled around the circumference - which is 2πr - divided by the radius:  which easily simplifies to: . Therefore, 1 revolution is  radians.

Three dimensions 

In three dimensions, angular displacement is an entity with a direction and a magnitude.  The direction specifies the axis of rotation, which always exists by virtue of the Euler's rotation theorem; the magnitude specifies the rotation in radians about that axis (using the right-hand rule to determine direction). This entity is called an axis-angle.

Despite having direction and magnitude, angular displacement is not a vector because it does not obey the commutative law for addition. Nevertheless, when dealing with infinitesimal rotations, second order infinitesimals can be discarded and in this case commutativity appears.

Several ways to describe angular displacement exist, like rotation matrices or Euler angles. See charts on SO(3) for others.

Matrix notation 

Given that any frame in the space can be described by a rotation matrix, the displacement among them can also be described by a rotation matrix. When this product is performed having a very small difference between both frames we will obtain a matrix close to the identity.

In the limit, we will have an infinitesimal rotation matrix.

Infinitesimal rotation matrices 

An infinitesimal angular displacement is an infinitesimal rotation matrix:

 As any rotation matrix has a single real eigenvalue, which is +1, this eigenvalue shows the rotation axis.
 Its module can be deduced from the value of the infinitesimal rotation.
 The shape of the matrix is like this: 

We can introduce here the infinitesimal angular displacement tensor or rotation generator associated:

When it is divided by the time, this will yield the angular velocity vector.

Generators of rotations

Suppose we specify an axis of rotation by a unit vector [x, y, z], and suppose we have an infinitely small rotation of angle Δθ about that vector. Expanding the rotation matrix as an infinite addition, and taking the first order approach, the rotation matrix ΔR is represented as:

 

A finite rotation through angle θ about this axis may be seen as a succession of small rotations about the same axis. Approximating Δθ as θ/N where N is a large number, a rotation of θ about the axis may be represented as:

It can be seen that Euler's theorem essentially states that all rotations may be represented in this form. The product  is the "generator" of the particular rotation, being the vector (x,y,z) associated with the matrix A. This shows that the rotation matrix and the axis-angle format are related by the exponential function.

One can derive a simple expression for the generator G. One starts with an arbitrary plane defined by a pair of perpendicular unit vectors a and b. In this plane one can choose an arbitrary vector x with perpendicular y. One then solves for y in terms of x and substituting into an expression for a rotation in a plane yields the rotation matrix R which includes the generator G = baT − abT.

To include vectors outside the plane in the rotation one needs to modify the above expression for R by including two projection operators that partition the space. This modified rotation matrix can be rewritten as an exponential function.

Analysis is often easier in terms of these generators, rather than the full rotation matrix. Analysis in terms of the generators is known as the Lie algebra of the rotation group.

Relationship with Lie algebras
The matrices in the Lie algebra are not themselves rotations; the skew-symmetric matrices are derivatives, proportional differences of rotations. An actual "differential rotation", or infinitesimal rotation matrix has the form

The computation rules are as usual except that infinitesimals of second order are routinely dropped. With these rules, these matrices do not satisfy all the same properties as ordinary finite rotation matrices under the usual treatment of infinitesimals. It turns out that the order in which infinitesimal rotations are applied is irrelevant. To see this exemplified, consult infinitesimal rotations SO(3).

Exponential map 

Connecting the Lie algebra to the Lie group is the exponential map, which is defined using the standard matrix exponential  series for  For any skew-symmetric matrix ,  is always a rotation matrix.

An important practical example is the  case. In rotation group SO(3), it is shown that one can identify every  with an Euler  vector , where  is a unit magnitude vector.

This is the matrix for a rotation around axis   by the angle  in half-angle form. For full detail, see exponential map SO(3).

Notice that for infinitesimal angles second order terms can be ignored and remains

See also
Angular distance
Angular position
Angular velocity
Infinitesimal rotation
Linear elasticity
Second moment of area

Notes

References

Sources
 
 

Angle